Fr Noel Reynolds was a priest of the Archdiocese of Dublin who died in 2002. He served as curate in eight parishes including Rathcoole, parish priest of Glendalough, County Wicklow and then chaplain at the National Rehabilitation Hospital, Dún Laoghaire, County Dublin.

A colleague of Reynolds, Fr Arthur O’Neill revealed he had reported concerns about Fr Noel Reynolds when he was parish priest of Rathnew, Co Wicklow, and Fr Reynolds was parish priest in neighbouring Glendalough, but Reynolds was allowed to continue his duties. Reynolds later admitted that he abused more than 100 children in eight parishes. Reynolds resigned from his role as parish priest on health grounds but Connell neglected to inform National Rehabilitation Hospital authorities where Reynolds was to become chaplain in 1997 that Reynolds was a paedophile.

See also
Roman Catholic Church sex abuse scandal
Roman Catholic priests accused of sex offenses
Ferns Report, on sexual abuse in the Roman Catholic Diocese of Ferns, Ireland
Crimen sollicitationis
Pontifical Secret

References 

20th-century births
2002 deaths
Catholic Church sexual abuse scandals in Ireland
Catholic priests convicted of child sexual abuse
People from Dún Laoghaire
20th-century Irish Roman Catholic priests
21st-century Irish Roman Catholic priests